Anchar Lake is a lake located near Soura area, near the city of Srinagar in Srinagar district of Kashmir, India. Situated close to Ganderbal, the lake is connected with the famous Dal Lake via a channel "Amir Khan Nallah" which passes through Gilsar and Khushal Sar. The lake is in a highly deteriorated condition. In case of flooding, the excessive water of Dal is diverted here.

Deterioration 
Once a popular tourist destination as tourists on shikaras and houseboats used to travel here from Dal Lake, over the years it has deteriorated owing to pollution, large scale encroachment, and illegal constructions in its surroundings. In the 1990s, when the Nallah Mar was covered to build the Mearplan highway around western side of Dal, six-foot pipes were laid under the new road, to allow Dal to continue to drain into the Anchar lake system, however the pipes soon clogged due to waste and debris.

Like the Dal lake and Wular Lake, it is home to the Hanji community which live near the lake in an area called as Anchar among the locals.

References

External links
 Anchar Lake

Lakes of Jammu and Kashmir
Srinagar
Water pollution in India